The Transcontinental railway Brazil-Peru (Fetab) is a rail project in Brazil and Peru, with the aim of linking the two countries and increasing commerce between these nations.

This initiative forms part of a group of projects of IIRSA for a railway between the cities of Pucallpa, in northern Peru and Cruzeiro do Sul, in western Brazil.

Project 
On 19 March 2008, the Peruvian Congress declared this project to be of national interest.

After Peruvian President Ollanta Humala visited China for APEC, and following on from a previous agreement with Brazil, a memorandum was approved in China to begin studies for a railway project to link the two oceans and integrate the markets of Brazil, Peru and China. The railway would go through the north of Peru.

In May 2015, Chinese prime minister Li Keqiang announced that during his visit to Peru he will sign agreements to participate in the Central Bi-Oceanic railway (CFBC), an alternative project for a railway between Brazil and southern Peru via Bolivia.

See also 
Central Bi-Oceanic railway
Brazil–Peru railway

References 

Proposed railway lines
Rail transport in Peru
Proposed railway lines in Brazil
Brazil–Peru relations